Tambacarnifex (meaning "Tambach butcher") is an extinct genus of varanodontine synapsids known from the Early Permian Tambach Formation of Free State of Thuringia, central Germany. It was first named by David S. Berman, Amy C. Henrici, Stuart S. Sumida, Thomas Martens and Valerie Pelletier in 2013 and the type species is Tambacarnifex unguifalcatus.

Below is a simplified version of the cladogram found by Berman et al., 2013.

References 

Varanopids
Prehistoric synapsid genera
Artinskian
Cisuralian synapsids of Europe
Permian Germany
Fossils of Germany
Fossil taxa described in 2013